The UEFA Euro 2012 qualifying play-off ties were played over two legs, with the first legs on 11 November and the second legs on 15 November 2011. The four winners are found according to the standard rules for the knockout phase in European competitions, and the winners qualified for the Euro 2012 tournament. Qualifying play-offs was a second stage (round) of UEFA Euro 2012 qualifying.

Ranking of second-placed teams
The highest ranked second placed team from the groups qualified automatically for the tournament, while the remainder entered the playoffs. As five groups contain six teams and four with five, matches against the sixth-placed team in each group were discarded in this ranking. As a result, a total of eight matches played by each team count toward the purpose of the second-placed ranking table.

Seedings

The draw for the play-offs was held on 13 October 2011 in Kraków, Poland, to determine the four pairings as well as the order of the home and away ties.

After the controversy caused by the UEFA play-offs during 2010 FIFA World Cup qualifying – which was originally to be an unseeded draw, but was later altered by FIFA to a seeded one – UEFA stated from the outset that the draw for the play-offs would be seeded. The four runners-up with the best positions in the UEFA team coefficient ranking system were therefore seeded.

Each nation's coefficient was generated by calculating:
40% of the average ranking points per game earned in the UEFA Euro 2012 qualifying group stage.
40% of the average ranking points per game earned in the 2010 FIFA World Cup qualifying stage and final tournament.
20% of the average ranking points per game earned in the UEFA Euro 2008 qualifying stage and final tournament.

The seedings were as follows:

Summary

|}

Matches

Croatia won 3–0 on aggregate and qualified for UEFA Euro 2012.

Republic of Ireland won 5–1 on aggregate and qualified for UEFA Euro 2012.

Czech Republic won 3–0 on aggregate and qualified for UEFA Euro 2012.

Portugal won 6–2 on aggregate and qualified for UEFA Euro 2012.

Goalscorers

References

UEFA Euro 2012 qualifying
2011–12 in Bosnia and Herzegovina football
2011–12 in Portuguese football
2011–12 in Croatian football
2011–12 in Turkish football
2011–12 in Czech football
2011–12 in Montenegrin football
Republic of Ireland at UEFA Euro 2012
2011 in Estonian football
Croatia at UEFA Euro 2012
Czech Republic at UEFA Euro 2012
Portugal at UEFA Euro 2012